(born March 9, 1958, in Shizuoka, Japan) is a J-pop singer and actress, better known by her stage name . She is a member of the popular 1970s idol group , known in the United States for their self-titled TV program. Mie is represented by her own management firm MHO Artist Co., Ltd.

Biography

Early life
Mitsuyo Nemoto met Keiko Masuda at Suehiro Junior High School in 1972. A year later, they attended Tokoha University and the Yamaha Music School in Hamamatsu. In May 1974, the duo formed a folk group called  and passed Yamaha's  audition.

Pink Lady
After winning an audition on the talent show Star Tanjō! in March 1976, Nemoto and Masuda signed with Victor Entertainment and became Pink Lady. Nemoto took the stage name  while Masuda became . After their debut single "Pepper Keibu" peaked at No. 4 on Oricon's singles charts in August 1976, Pink Lady's second single "S.O.S." reached No. 1, beginning a nine-song streak of No. 1 hits from November 1976 to December 1978. Their biggest single was "UFO" which spent 10 weeks at No. 1 and sold over 1.55 million copies.

When their popularity took a downturn in 1979, Pink Lady turned their focus on the United States, with their first U.S. single "Kiss in the Dark" reaching No. 37 on the Billboard Hot 100 and becoming the first Japanese recording act to chart in America since Kyu Sakamoto in 1963. In 1980, the duo starred with comedian Jeff Altman in the NBC variety show Pink Lady and Jeff. Unfortunately, the show was plagued by the language barrier between the duo and the production crew. Poor ratings and scathing reviews resulted in Pink Lady and Jeff being cancelled after five episodes, with a sixth episode remaining unaired.

Following the failure of Pink Lady and Jeff, as well as the decline of disco music, Pink Lady held a press conference on September 1, 1980, to announce their disbandment within six months. During the press conference, Mie stated that her stage name would change from "ミー" to "MIE" to reflect her solo career. Pink Lady performed their final concert at Korakuen Stadium on March 31, 1981, before going their separate ways. Mie and Kei have since reunited several times to record new songs and perform special concerts.

Solo career
Following Pink Lady's disbandment, Mie released her first solo album "I MY MIE" on August 21, 1981. Her biggest single was a Japanese-language cover of Moving Pictures' "Never" in 1984, which peaked at No. 4 in Oricon's singles chart and sold 270,000 copies. "Never" was also used as the theme song for the TBS drama series . Her song  won the Silver Award at the 1984 Tokyo Music Festival. Majority of her singles from 1984 to 1995 were used as either TV drama themes or commercial jingles for companies such as Shiseido, Sanden Corporation, Satsuma Shuzo, and Takefuji.

With these two films, she shed her wholesome family-friendly Pink Lady image for a sexier, more mature persona. A year later, she starred in her own gravure idol TV special titled Mie: Private Time, which was shot in Hawaii.

In 1985, Mie starred as the kunoichi  in seasons 4 and 5 of the jidaigeki TV series Shadow Warriors.

At the same time, she once again changed the style of her stage name; this time, as the kanji "未唯". On February 21, Animetal Lady Marathon was released, featuring metal covers of popular female-oriented anime theme songs. Animetal Lady Marathon II was released on April 10, 2002, as Mie's final contribution to Animetal.

In 2001, Mie starred as Ethel McCormack in the Japanese adaptation of the Footloose stage musical. The production also featured her Pink Lady partner Keiko Masuda as Vi Moore. She also collaborated with the heavy metal band X.Y.Z.→A to record the single "Nobody Knows Me (but Only Heaven)" that year.

In 2002, at the age of 45, Mie published the gravure book Future Lady: Mothership.

In 2007, Mie produced me ing, her first studio album in 15 years. Released on her own label MHO, the album features songs written by Mie herself. To coincide with the album's release, Victor Entertainment, Sony Music Entertainment Japan, and Universal Music Japan reissued Mie's previous albums with bonus tracks on each CD. A year later, Mie wrote the children's storybook  as part of Save the Children's .

In September 2018, Mie was selected by Kao Corporation to be the brand ambassador of the company's  line.

On March 11, 2022, Mie participated in the Shuichi "Ponta" Murakami tribute concert "One Last Live", performing "Pepper Keibu" (with Yo Hitoto), "Wanted (Shimei Tehai)" (with Maki Ohguro) and "UFO" (with Chisato Moritaka). On December 26, Victor Entertainment announced it will release a new compilation album titled Mie to 未唯mie: 1981–2023 All Time Best on March 1, 2023.

Mie currently performs with her band at Blues Alley Japan in Tokyo, often doing alternate renditions of Pink Lady songs.

Personal life
Mie married music producer  in 1998, but they divorced in 2004.

Mie's brother Katsuyoshi Nemoto runs a restaurant in Tokyo called .

Discography

Studio albums

Live albums

Compilation albums

Singles

Promotional singles

Collaborations
  (collaboration with Naoko Amihama) (1987-03-21)
 "Nobody Knows Me (but Only Heaven)" (collaboration with X.Y.Z.→A) (2001-11-29)
  (Bad Friends, as part of ) (2009-12-16)
 "Raining in the Sunshine" (collaboration with Demon Kakka) (2012-05-16)

Filmography

Film
  (Toei Central Film, 1982)
  (Shochiku, 1982)
  (Shochiku, 1983)

TV
  (Fuji TV, 1985 April 2-October 1)
  (Fuji TV, 1985 October 7-December 30)
  - Mitsuko Kurihara 
  - Episode 10 (TXN, 2015 June 19)

Home video
  (Sanrio, 1994)
  (Takeshobo, 2002)
 未唯mie with 3/7(seven) LIVE at Blues Alley Japan 2008.11.28 (MHO, 2010)
 未唯mie MONTHLY LIVE 2010.06.25 Pink Lady Night (MHO, 2010)

Bibliography
  (Shueisha, 1983)
  (Takeshobo, 2002)
  (Gakken, 2002-11-29)
  (Random House/Kodansha, 2008-04-23)
  (Tokuma Shoten, 2012-02-21)

References

External links 
 
  (Victor Entertainment)
  (Sony Music Entertainment Japan)
  (Universal Music Japan)
 
 Mie discography at Discogs
 English Pink Lady fansite

1958 births
Japanese idols
Japanese women heavy metal singers
Japanese women pop singers
Japanese women rock singers
Japanese musical theatre actresses
Living people
People from Shizuoka (city)
Musicians from Shizuoka Prefecture
20th-century Japanese women singers
20th-century Japanese singers
21st-century Japanese women singers
21st-century Japanese singers
Animetal members
English-language singers from Japan